James Allen (born 5 November 1966) is a British former TV commentator and journalist, now President of Motorsport Network who worked as Formula One (F1) commentator for ITV from 2000 to 2008, and subsequently as BBC Radio 5 Live F1 commentator, BBC F1 Correspondent, Financial Times F1 correspondent and presenter for Ten Sport in Australia. He lives in London with his wife, Pip, and their two sons, Enzo and Emerson.

Family background and education
Allen was born in Liverpool, England and was a pupil at Merchant Taylors' School, Crosby, and student of English and Modern Languages at Lady Margaret Hall, Oxford, gaining a master's degree. His father, Bill, was a professional racing driver who raced for Lotus in the 1960s and was a Class Winner in 1961 at Le Mans. He organised the first historic racing championships in the 1970s and sat for many years in the sport's administration, serving as a Commission Chair on the RAC motor sports council.

Career

Early career

ITV
With Nigel Mansell's move to IndyCar in 1993, Allen was hired by ITV in 1994 to help present coverage of the season.

With Murray Walker unable to commentate at the 2000 French Grand Prix, Allen took over as one of the main commentators alongside Martin Brundle. Walker wound down his career the next year, missing five races, all of which Allen covered. ITV had considered trying a number of guest commentators to decide who would be best suited to replace Walker, but instead opted to keep Allen on board full-time. He took over permanently after the 2001 United States Grand Prix and commentated on every subsequent Grand Prix while the sport was broadcast on ITV, winning a number of Royal Television Society and BAFTA Awards. The 2007 Canadian Grand Prix was Allen's 100th as a commentator and he did 129 in total in the role. Allen also wrote "James Allen's Analysis" for the ITV website. His last commentary for ITV was the 2008 Brazilian Grand Prix when ITV's F1 broadcast contract ended. The race was watched by over 11 million people in the U.K.

BBC
Between 2012 and 2015, Allen was the BBC Formula 1 Correspondent and lead commentator for BBC Radio 5 Live. He edited his own F1 website providing insight and analysis of the sport and managed a digital media business, working with sponsors and brands in F1 which leveraged the site. He made an appearance on Celebrity Mastermind, answering questions on Roald Dahl books. He won the competition, with a score of 23 points.

Writing
Allen has written three books, the first of which was his ghost-written autobiography of Nigel Mansell published by HarperCollins. He has also written two books on Michael Schumacher: Quest for Redemption (also published in paperback as Driven to Extremes) and The Edge of Greatness.

He has been the F1 correspondent of the Financial Times newspaper since 1999. In this capacity in April 2011, he wrote the first story revealing the plan to create a new all-electric racing series, Formula E.

Formula One Management
Allen was one of the official Formula One Management World Feed interviewers for post-qualifying and post-race, beginning this role at the 2009 British Grand Prix. He also moderated the official FIA press conference sessions with drivers and team principals during F1 race weekends. From 2013 onwards, he has served as the moderator of the annual FIA Sport Conference and has become one of the principal moderators of thought leadership events around motorsport.

Motorsport Network
In 2017, Allen joined the US-owned Motorsport Network and in April 2018 moved into an executive role as President EMEA. Since September 2018, he has been the network's president, based in London, helping the business to diversify from digital media into e-sports and gaming. Among other activities, Allen led the Global Fan Survey project in 2021 and 2022, conducting major surveys with Formula 1, INDYCAR and MotoGP in multiple languages, reaching over 330,000 respondents. He hosts the Financial Times Business of F1 Forum events at selected F1 Grands Prix.

He created the thought leadership video podcast strand #ThinkingForward, which runs on all editions of Motorsport Network's websites in 15 languages. Allen speaks to leaders from across motorsport about topics such as sustainability, diversity and inclusion and future technologies, aimed at giving enthusiasts an understanding of the future direction of the sport.

He appeared in the 2019 Formula E film And We Go Green, directed by Fisher Stevens.

Allen was featured as one of the principal narrative voices in the hit Netflix 2021 documentary film Schumacher, directed by Michael Wech. He was billed as Schumacher's biographer.

In 2019, Allen was Executive Producer on the feature film Motorsport Heroes written and directed by Manish Pandey, writer of the acclaimed movie Senna.

Awards
Along with former co-commentator Martin Brundle, Allen picked up the Autosport award for best moment of the year which recognised the pair's commentary in the closing moments of the 2008 Brazilian Grand Prix. The Brazil coverage also won a third consecutive BAFTA award for Allen, Brundle and the ITV team. In 2022 Allen was appointed as a judge on the BAFTA Sports Programme of the Year panel.

Allen's website JamesAllenOnF1 was voted "Best F1 Blog" by fans in the annual Silverstone Media Awards in 2012 and 2013.

References

External links
Official Website
James Allen biography at itv.com

1966 births
Living people
Alumni of Lady Margaret Hall, Oxford
People educated at Merchant Taylors' Boys' School, Crosby
Motorsport announcers
Formula One journalists and reporters
British sports broadcasters
BBC sports presenters and reporters